Earl Jackson Gregory Jr. (October 3, 1944 – March 2, 2019) was  an American football defensive end in the National Football League (NFL) who played for the Cleveland Browns and the New York Giants in a 13-year career that lasted from 1967 through 1979. He is unofficially credited with 103 quarterback sacks for his career (38 with the Browns and 65 with the Giants).  The Browns credit him with 14 sacks for the 1970 NFL season, the second-best total in team history.

Gregory played college football at University of Tennessee at Chattanooga and Delta State University. He was inducted into the Mississippi Sports Hall of Fame in 2000. His father, Jack Gregory Sr., played with the Cleveland Rams in 1941.
Gregory died March 2, 2019, in Monroe County, Mississippi.

References

External links
 NFL.com player page

1944 births
2019 deaths
American football defensive ends
Chattanooga Mocs football players
Cleveland Browns players
Delta State Statesmen football players
New York Giants players
Eastern Conference Pro Bowl players
National Conference Pro Bowl players
People from Okolona, Mississippi
Players of American football from Mississippi